Félix Narjoux (19 December 1836 – 1891) was a French architect.

External links
 

1836 births
1891 deaths
19th-century French writers
People from Chalon-sur-Saône
French male writers
19th-century French architects
Date of death missing
19th-century French male writers